The 1946 Volta a Catalunya was the 26th edition of the Volta a Catalunya cycle race and was held from 8 September to 15 September 1946. The race started in Montjuïc and finished in Barcelona. The race was won by Julián Berrendero.

General classification

References

1946
Volta
1946 in Spanish road cycling
September 1946 sports events in Europe